Dragonheads is the debut EP by Finnish folk metal band Ensiferum. It was released on 15 February 2006 by Spinefarm Records. It is the first Ensiferum release featuring the then recently hired members Petri Lindroos, Sami Hinkka and Janne Parviainen. Mastered at Finnvox Studios. Warrior's Quest and White Storm are the re-recordings of songs from the band's second demo. Finnish Medley is a medley of the Finnish traditional pieces Karjalan kunnailla, Myrskyluodon Maija, and Metsämiehen laulu.

Track listing

Personnel
 Petri Lindroos - harsh vocals, guitar
 Markus Toivonen - guitar, clean vocals, backing vocals, percussion
 Meiju Enho - keyboards
 Sami Hinkka - bass, clean vocals, backing vocals
 Janne Parviainen - drums

Additional musicians
Kaisa Saari - female vocals (on track 6), recorder (on track 3)
Vesa Vigman - mandolin (on track 3)
Frostheim - kantele (on track 3)

References

Ensiferum albums
2006 EPs